The Milinda Pañha is a Buddhist text which dates from sometime between 100 BC and 200 AD. It purports to record a dialogue between the Indian Buddhist sage Nāgasena, and the 2nd century BC Indo-Greek king Menander I (Pali: Milinda) of Bactria, in Sagala, present-day Sialkot.

The Milinda Pañha is regarded as canonical in Burmese Buddhism, included as part of the book of Khuddaka Nikaya. An abridged version is included as part of Chinese Mahayana translations of the canon. The Milinda Pañha is not regarded as canonical by Thai or Sri Lankan Buddhism, however, despite the surviving Theravāda text being in Sinhalese script.

The Chinese text titled the Monk Nāgasena Sutra corresponds to the first three chapters of the Milindapanha. It was translated sometime during the Eastern Jin dynasty (317–420).

History 

It is generally accepted by scholars that the work is composite, with additions made over some time. In support of this, it is noted that the Chinese versions of the work are substantially shorter.

The earliest part of the text is believed to have been written between 100 BC and 200 AD. The text may have initially been written in Sanskrit; Oskar von Hinüber suggests, based on an extant Chinese translation of Mil as well as some unique conceptualizations within the text, the text's original language might have been Gandhari. However, apart from the Sri Lankan Pali edition and its derivatives, no other copies are known.

The oldest manuscript of the Pali text was copied in 1495 AD. Based on references within the text itself, significant sections of the text are lost, making Milinda the only Pali text known to have been passed down as incomplete.

It is mentioned in the Grande Inscription d'Angkor engraved in 1701 on the walls of Angkor Wat in Cambodia.

The book is included in the inscriptions of the Canon approved by the Burmese Fifth Council and the printed edition of the Sixth Council text.

Thomas Rhys Davids says it is the greatest work of classical Indian prose, saying:

Moriz Winternitz however maintains that this is true only of the earlier parts.

Contents
The contents of the Milindapañhā are:
Background History
Questions on Distinguishing Characteristics : (Characteristics of Attention and Wisdom, Characteristic of Wisdom, Characteristic of Contact, Characteristic of Feeling, Characteristic of Perception, Characteristic of Volition, Characteristic of Consciousness, Characteristic of Applied Thought, Characteristic of Sustained Thought, etc.)
Questions for the Cutting Off of Perplexity : (Transmigration and Rebirth, The Soul, Non-Release From Evil Deeds, Simultaneous Arising in Different Places, Doing Evil Knowingly and Unknowingly, etc.)
Questions on Dilemmas : Speaks of several puzzles and these puzzles were distributed in eighty-two dilemmas.
A Question Solved By Inference
Discusses the Special Qualities of Asceticism
Questions on Talk of Similes

According to Oskar von Hinüber, while King Menander is an actual historical figure, Bhikkhu Nagasena is otherwise unknown, the text includes anachronisms, and the dialogue lacks any sign of Greek influence but instead is traceable to the Upanisads.

The text mentions Nāgasena's father Soñuttara, his teachers Rohana, Assagutta of Vattaniya and Dhammarakkhita of Asoka Ārāma near Pātaliputta, and another teacher named Āyupāla from Sankheyya near Sāgala.

Menander I
According to the Milindapanha, Milinda/ Menander, identified as Menander I, embraced the Buddhist faith. He is described as constantly accompanied by a guard of 500 Greek (Yonaka) soldiers, and two of his counselors are named Demetrius and Antiochus.

In the Milindanpanha, Menander is introduced as the "king of the city of Sāgala in India, Milinda by name, learned, eloquent, wise, and able". Buddhist tradition relates that, following his discussions with Nāgasena, Menander adopted the Buddhist faith "as long as life shall last" and then handed over his kingdom to his son to retire from the world. It is described that he attained enlightenment afterwards.

Translations
The work has been translated into English twice, once in 1890 by Thomas William Rhys Davids (reprinted by Dover Publications in 1963) and once in 1969  by Isaline Blew Horner (reprinted in 1990 by the Pali Text Society).

Questions of King Milinda, tr T. W. Rhys Davids, Sacred Books of the East, volumes XXXV & XXXVI, Clarendon/Oxford, 1890–94; reprinted by Motilal Banarsidass, Delhi Vol. 1, Vol. 2
Milinda's Questions, tr I. B. Horner, 1963–4, 2 volumes, Pali Text Society, Bristol

Abridgements include:

 Pesala, Bhikkhu (ed.), The Debate of King Milinda: An Abridgement of the Milindapanha. Delhi: Motilal Banarsidass, 1992.  Based on Rhys Davids (1890, 1894).
 Mendis, N.K.G. (ed.), The Questions of King Milinda: An Abridgement of the Milindapanha. Kandy, Sri Lanka: Buddhist Publication Society, 1993 (repr. 2001).  Based on Horner (1963–64). Available for free download here

See also
 Anatta, doctrine of "non-self"
 Anupiṭaka
 Greco-Buddhism
 Khuddaka Nikāya
 Paracanonical texts (Theravada Buddhism)
 Ship of Theseus

References

Sources

External links
‘’The Questions of King Milinda’’ translated by Thomas William Rhys Davids.
The Debate of King Milinda, Most Recent HTML and PDF Editions.
The Debate of King Milinda, Abridged Edition by Bhikkhu Pesala
Milindapañha – Selected passages in both Pali and English, translated by John Kelly
 Milinda Panha Sinhalese translation

Greco-Buddhism
Buddhist apologetic works
Pali Buddhist texts
Theravada Buddhist texts
Khuddaka Nikaya
Indo-Greeks
2nd-century BC literature
Menander I